Bob Cottingham (born April 16, 1966) is an American fencer who competed in the sabre events at the 1988 and 1992 Summer Olympics.

Raised in Orange, New Jersey playing football and lacrosse, Cottingham got into fencing as a high school student at Montclair Kimberley Academy.

He fenced for the Columbia Lions fencing team.  A four-time All-American in fencing at Columbia University, Cottingham went on to receive a J.D. from Rutgers University and now heads a business consulting firm, Sabre88. 

He is also heavily involved with the Peter Westbrook Foundation, a nonprofit devoted to exposing New York City youths to fencing. 

In November 2012, he was named as a 2013 recipient of the NCAA Silver Anniversary Award, presented each year to six distinguished former student-athletes on the 25th anniversary of the end of their college sports careers.

References

External links
 

1966 births
Living people
American male sabre fencers
Columbia Lions fencers
Olympic fencers of the United States
Fencers at the 1988 Summer Olympics
Fencers at the 1992 Summer Olympics
Montclair Kimberley Academy alumni
People from Orange, New Jersey
Sportspeople from Essex County, New Jersey
Pan American Games medalists in fencing
Pan American Games silver medalists for the United States
Fencers at the 1987 Pan American Games
20th-century Argentine people